The Old Treasury Building on Spring Street in Melbourne, built 1858-62 as a home for the Treasury Department of the Government of Victoria as well as the Governor In Council, now houses a range of functions, including a museum of Melbourne history, known as Old Treasury Building Museum.

History

The Treasury Building was constructed between 1858–62, and is considered one of Australia's finest Renaissance Revival buildings, constructed in palazzo form and built from wealth accumulated during the Victorian Gold Rush. One original purpose was to house some of that wealth in the 'gold vaults' in the basement, but by the time it was finished the rush was over, and they were used to store government documents instead.

The building was designed by young architect J. J. Clark who was just 19 years of age. The oldest surviving designs for the building date back to 1857, and many of J J Clark's drafts are on display throughout the building.  Clark later went on to design many government buildings both in Victoria and elsewhere, notably the Brisbane Treasury in Queensland, considered to be another fine example in a classical style. Architectural historian Miles Lewis once described The Old Treasury as the "finest public building exterior in Australia".

While the building itself was completed in 1862, a shortage of funds meant that the forecourt remained unfinished. Until 1868 the front steps and terrace were temporary, with individual staircases leading to the three main front doors. These were replaced with the grand forecourt still standing today. 

It is the cornerstone of the Treasury Reserve government precinct adjacent to the Treasury Gardens and creates an important vista terminating Collins Street, the financial spine of the city.

When the official treasury offices were moved next door to 2 Treasury Place in 1877-78, the building was nicknamed the 'Old Treasury'.

As a leading public building in Melbourne, located in a prominent position with open space around it, the Old Treasury has been the focus for many celebrations and major public events. The arrivals and departures of the Governors of Victoria were occasions for expressions of loyalty to the Crown and sometimes for political statements. In recent years it has been the destination for the Grand Final parade of AFL footballers.

The building is also notable for its role when Melbourne was the temporary capital city of Australia after Federation, with the National Executive Council meeting there.  Previously in February 1899, a "secret" Premiers' conference was convened, when it was decided Melbourne's Parliament House would be the temporary capital until the location of the Australian National Capital was officially decided.

Establishment of a museum

During the 1970s, the Victorian government, led by Premier Dick Hamer was developing policy for museums in Victoria. In 1981, Hamer's Arts Minister, the Hon. Norman Lacy, established a Museums Development Committee to develop a comprehensive museums policy for Victoria. He then also proposed to the Executive Committee of Victoria's 150th Anniversary Celebrations in 1984 that a new Museum of Social and Political History be established at the Old Treasury Building. 

Finally in 1994 after restoration of the building, the Old Treasury Building Museum was opened with exhibitions detailing the history of Melbourne, the Victorian gold rush, and the history of the building. Operations of the buildings and the museum are vested in an Old Treasury Building Reserve Committee of Management, and is a registered charity. The Museum has changed name a number of times, becoming the Gold Treasury Museum, the City Museum at Old Treasury and then the Old Treasury Building Museum again. Since 2011 it has presented programs in partnership with Public Record Office Victoria (PROV).

In the media 
The Old Treasury Building features in the climactic sequence of the film Knowing (2009). Though set in Boston, Massachusetts, the movie was shot in Melbourne (the two cities are officially recognised as being sister cities). A number of other Melbourne landmarks are also featured.

Occupants 
The Old Treasury was built to house the Treasury Department and store gold, but also provided offices for the leaders of the young colony, including the Governor, the Premier (at the time called Chief Secretary), the Treasurer and the Auditor General. Since its construction in 1862, it has also held the office of His Excellency the Governor of Victoria, who still holds weekly meetings of the Executive Council, consisting of the Governor and at least two Ministers of the Crown, that is, the leaders of the governing party.  The Governor in Council as this meeting is called, is the formal enacting of legislation when the Governor's signature and the Great Seal of Victoria is put in place on the bill.  Various other appointments and other regulations are also formally made at this weekly meeting, upon the advice of the Premier and Parliament of Victoria.

In addition to the museum, the Old Treasury Building is now home to the Office of the Victorian Government Architect, The Victorian Marriage Registry, and offices for most living former Premiers of Victoria.

See also
 Architecture of Melbourne

References

 The Treasury Reserve. Frances O'Neil. Department of Infrastructure. 2000.

External links

 Old Treasury Building
 Public Records Office Victoria
 A Submission for a Museum of Social and Political History at the Old Treasury Building to the Executive Committee of Victoria's 150th Anniversary Celebrations in July 1981 

Museums in Melbourne
History museums in Australia
Buildings and structures in Melbourne City Centre
Government buildings completed in 1862
1862 establishments in Australia
Heritage-listed buildings in Melbourne
Italian Renaissance Revival architecture
Landmarks in Melbourne
2010 establishments in Australia